Pietro Terracciano (born 8 March 1990) is an Italian professional footballer who plays as a goalkeeper for Serie A club Fiorentina.

Club career

Nocerina
Terracciano began his professional career with Nocerina before spending the 2010–11 season on loan at Lega Pro Seconda Divisione side Milazzo. After beginning his professional career in the lower ranks of Italian football, he transferred to Serie A outfit, Catania in June 2011.

Catania
On 30 June 2011, Catania confirmed the outright signing of Terracciano on a permanent basis from newly promoted Serie B side Nocerina. The player began the season as the fourth choice goalkeeper at the Sicilian club, behind Argentine international, Mariano Andújar, Italian veteran Andrea Campagnolo, and former Slovakian U-21 international, Tomáš Košický, and remained fourth choice following the new arrival of Juan Pablo Carrizo and the departure of Andújar. On 21 April 2012, because of the expulsion of Carrizo in the last match, he made his Serie A debut with the club. He remained third choice during the 2012–13 Serie A campaign, behind Andújar and Alberto Frison.

On 23 July 2013, Terracciano signed for Avellino on a season-long loan deal with an option to purchase the player outright following the 2013–14 Serie B season. After having played for Catania again in the 2014–15 Serie B, he moved to Salernitana on a two-year loan until 2017.

Fiorentina
On 22 January 2019, Terracciano joined to Fiorentina on loan until 30 June 2019.
On 7 July 2019, Terracciano signed to Fiorentina.

References

External links
Profile at the ACF Fiorentina website 

Living people
1990 births
Sportspeople from the Province of Caserta
Footballers from Campania
Italian footballers
Association football goalkeepers
Serie A players
Serie B players
Serie C players
A.S.G. Nocerina players
S.S. Milazzo players
Catania S.S.D. players
U.S. Avellino 1912 players
U.S. Salernitana 1919 players
Empoli F.C. players
ACF Fiorentina players